Saint-Remy is a commune in the Vosges department in Grand Est in northeastern France.

It is located on the D7, 4 km south-west of Étival-Clairefontaine.

See also 
 Communes of the Vosges department

References 

Communes of Vosges (department)